Robbie Abel (born 4 July 1989) is an Australian professional rugby union player who plays at hooker for NSW in Super Rugby and for the Māori All Blacks. He previously played in Australia for the Brumbies, Canberra Vikings and Perth Spirit, and also played for Northland and  Auckland in the ITM Cup.

Career
Robbie Abel was selected for the Australia 'A' Schools team in 2007, after moving to St Edmund's College, Canberra from Griffith NSW in 2006. He was a part of the Brumbies Academy from 2007 till 2010, having a stint in New Zealand with Northland rugby in 2009.

Abel took a two-year hiatus from rugby from 2010 till the end of 2012 to undertake a mission for the Church of Jesus Christ of Latter-day Saints in  Western Australia.

Upon completion of his duties he linked up with Northland Rugby Union and the from 2012 till the end of 2013 spending 2 years playing between Canberra and Whangarei for the Brumbies Runners and the Taniwha in New Zealand's ITM Cup.

He moved back to Western Australia to become a member of the Western Force playing squad ahead of the 2014 Super Rugby season. Abel didn't make any senior appearances in 2014 but turned out for Perth Spirit in the inaugural National Rugby Championship later that year scoring 5 tries in 9 appearances, and he was named again in the Force squad for 2015.

Abel then signed a contract with the Brumbies, joining the Canberra Vikings late in the 2015 season. In 2016 Abel made his Super Rugby debut for the Brumbies against the Cheetahs in Bloemfontein. Abel featured in all games for the 2017 season and all games he was available for in 2018.

In 2018 Abel took a contract to play with Auckland in the Mitre 10 Cup competition. After a successful season with Auckland which saw the team win the 2018 Premiership, losing just one game in the regular season, Abel was named in the Māori All Blacks team to tour USA and South America.

References

Super Rugby statistics

1989 births
Australian rugby union players
Australian people of Māori descent
Northland rugby union players
Perth Spirit players
Canberra Vikings players
ACT Brumbies players
Auckland rugby union players
Rugby union hookers
Rugby union players from New South Wales
Australian Latter Day Saints
Living people
Māori All Blacks players
Melbourne Rebels players
New South Wales Waratahs players